Bird Songs is the 22nd album by Joe Lovano released via the Blue Note label in 2011. The album features Esperanza Spalding, James Weidman, Otis Brown III and Francisco Mela performing songs mostly written or performed by alto saxophonist Charlie Parker.

Reception
Chris Barton of Los Angeles Times stated "Though a showcase for history, Lovano and his band expertly show the many ways these classics can still throw sparks". John Fordham of The Guardian noted "capricious than Django Bates's tribute to Charlie Parker last year, but just as inspired and rich in references, Joe Lovano's Bird Songs is not just a stunning celebration of Parker's music, but a salute to the sax giants – Sonny Rollins, Dexter Gordon, Ornette Coleman and Wayne Shorter – who were liberated by it". Phil Johnson of The Independent added "It's an homage to Charlie Parker, but not, says Lovano, a tribute record. Rather, Parker's music is approached from a post-Coltrane, post-free jazz aesthetic, with the rhythmic edginess of bebop elided into an all-the-time-in-the-world fluidity. A masterpiece".

Track listing
All compositions by Charlie Parker except as indicated

 "Passport" – 5:27
 "Donna Lee" – 4:30
 "Barbados" – 6:19
 "Moose the Mooche" – 6:34
 "Loverman"  (Jimmy Davis, Roger "Ram" Ramirez, James Sherman) – 9:03
 "Birdyard" (Joe Lovano) – 1:47
 "Ko Ko" – 6:20
 "Blues Collage (Carvin' the Bird–Bird Feathers–Bloomdido)" – 1:52
 "Dexterity" – 2:49
 "Dewey Square" – 8:25
 "Yardbird Suite" – 11:58

Personnel
Joe Lovano - saxophone
Esperanza Spalding - bass
James Weidman - piano
Otis Brown III - drums, percussion
Francisco Mela - drums, percussion

References

External links
 

2011 albums
Joe Lovano albums
Blue Note Records albums